Hřensko is a municipality and village in Děčín District in the Ústí nad Labem Region of the Czech Republic. It has about 300 inhabitants.

Administrative parts
The village of Mezná is an administrative part of Hřensko.

Geography

It lies on the border with Germany and is adjacent to Bad Schandau and Schöna.

Hřensko is situated at the confluence of the Kamenice and Elbe rivers, in the Elbe valley.

Hřensko lies in the Elbe Sandstone Mountains. Most of the municipality lies in the Bohemian Switzerland National Park.

History
Hřensko was established during the 15th century as a trading settlement.

Transport

There are two border crossings in Hřensko: the road border crossing Hřensko / Schmilka and the river border crossing Hřensko / Schöna.

Sights
The municipality is a portal to the Bohemian Switzerland National Park. The main attractions in the municipal territory are the Kamenice Gorge and Pravčická brána, the largest natural stone bridge in Europe. They are among the most visited nature tourist destinations in the entire country.

In popular culture
Pravčická brána was featured in the film The Chronicles of Narnia: The Lion, the Witch and the Wardrobe.

Notable people
Erich Clar (1902–1987), German chemist

References

External links

Virtual show

Villages in Děčín District
Elbe Sandstone Mountains
Bohemian Switzerland
Czech Republic–Germany border crossings